Muhammad Shahjahan (2 January 1939 – 20 September 2000) was a Bangladeshi academic. He served as the 6th vice-chancellor of Bangladesh University of Engineering and Technology (BUET).

Education

Shahjahan passed matriculation exam from Armanitola Government High School in 1954 and intermediate examination from Dhaka College in 1956. 
He then earned his bachelor's in civil engineering from Ahsanullah Engineering College in 1960. He obtained his master's from Colorado State University in 1963 and Ph.D. from University of Strathclyde in 1970.

Career
Shahjahan joined as a lecturer in Ahsanullah Engineering College (later BUET) in October 1960. He served as the vice-chancellor of BUET from April 1991 to November 1996. His second-term reappointment was truncated by a teacher-students-employees agitation. He retired from BUET in January 2000.

Shahjahan died on 20 September 2000 at Shaheed Suhrawardy Hospital in Dhaka.

References

1939 births
2000 deaths
People from Dhaka
Dhaka College alumni
Bangladesh University of Engineering and Technology alumni
Colorado State University alumni
Alumni of the University of Strathclyde
Academic staff of Bangladesh University of Engineering and Technology
Vice-Chancellors of Bangladesh University of Engineering and Technology
Dhaka Collegiate School alumni